Charles Stafford Dickens (1888–1967) was a British actor, screenwriter and film director.

Selected filmography
Screenwriter
 Command Performance (1931)
 The Midshipmaid (1932)
 Wild Boy (1934)
 Temptation (1934)
 Car of Dreams (1935)
 Things Are Looking Up (1935)
 Windbag the Sailor (1936)
 Everybody Dance (1936)
 The Live Wire (1937)
 Follow Your Star (1938)
 Dead Men Tell No Tales (1938)
 The Voice Within (1946)
 The Idol of Paris  (1948)
 My Wife's Lodger (1952)

Director
 Please Teacher (1937)
 Skimpy in the Navy (1949)

References

External links

1888 births
1967 deaths
British male screenwriters
British film directors
20th-century British screenwriters